Gautrain is an  higher-speed express commuter rail system in Gauteng, South Africa, which links Johannesburg, Pretoria, Kempton Park and O.R. Tambo International Airport. It takes 15 minutes to travel from Sandton to O.R. Tambo International Airport on the Gautrain and 35 minutes from Pretoria in Tshwane to Park Station in Johannesburg. The Gautrain has 10 stations. Buses, shuttles and midibus services are available to transport passengers to and from all stations excluding the O.R. Tambo International Airport Station.

Background 
The Gautrain is mainly aimed at providing and optimising an integrated, innovative public transport system that enables and promotes the long-term sustainable economic growth of Gauteng. It is also part of a broader vision to industrialise and modernise the region, including a commitment towards creating and sustaining an integrated culture of public transport use. The Gautrain is implemented as a public-private partnership (PPP) in terms of Treasury Regulation 16 of the Public Finance Management Act (PFMA). The Gauteng Provincial Government (GPG) is the public partner and the primary promoter of the Project. The Concessionaire is the Bombela Concession Company (Pty) Ltd, which holds a 19½-year concession for the construction, operation and maintenance of the Gautrain.

As a PPP, the Gautrain has two main entities responsible for keeping its wheels rolling. These are the GPG through the GMA and the Bombela Concession Company (BCC).

BCC is responsible in terms of the Concession Agreement (CA) for the design, build and part-finance of the Gautrain. The concession also includes the operations of the Gautrain and the Concessionaire is responsible for delivering all the services as defined in the CA to specified levels of performance. These include the services related to the train and buses, safety, stations, revenue collection, marketing and passenger communication. The Concessionaire also takes responsibility for the management and maintenance of all the System assets. It does so following international good practices and its corporate governance regime. It is a private, ring-fenced company with three shareholders:

Murray & Roberts is a construction company listed on the Johannesburg Stock Exchange that operates in Southern Africa, the Middle East, Southeast Asia, Australasia and North and South America;
 SPG Concessions is a Broad-Based Black Economic Empowerment company represented in all of the Concessionaire sub-contracts;
 J&J Group is a South African broad-based investment holding and management company.

Lines in operation 
, there are three Gautrain lines in operation.

History 
The project was announced in 2000 before South Africa won the rights to host the 2010 FIFA World Cup.

The Gauteng Department of Transport obtained environmental authorisation and conducted an Environmental Impact Assessment (EIA) for this purpose. The authorisation was granted on 25 April 2004. On 7 December 2005, the South African government gave the go-ahead for the project, expected to cost more than 24 billion Rand.

In February 2006, Finance Minister Trevor Manuel announced the allocation of R7.1 billion from the National Fiscus for Gautrain. On 16 February 2006 then Gauteng Premier Mbhazima Shilowa announced that the Gauteng Province had reached commercial close with the Bombela Consortium, the preferred bidder and that negotiations to reach financial close commenced.

In 2006 the Province signed a 20‑year PPP contract with the Bombela Concession Company, which included Murray & Roberts, empowerment organisation Strategic Partners Group, Bombardier, Bouygues, and various minority shareholders.

Construction started on 28 September 2006, and investors, developers, small businesses, and entrepreneurs are starting new ventures such as office blocks, shopping malls, entertainment, and residential developments along Gautrain's network. The demand for land as well as property prices in these areas increased dramatically.

Construction 
The rail system was built by Bombela Concession Company, a partnership between Bombardier Transportation, Bouygues, Murray & Roberts, the Strategic Partners Group and RATP Group, the J&J Group, and Absa Bank.

Initial civil works for the Gautrain started in May 2006 and construction commenced after the signing of the Concession Agreement between the GPG and the Bombela Concession Company on 28 September 2006. The main civil contractor was Murray & Roberts.

The project was constructed simultaneously in two phases. The first phase involved the section between O.R. Tambo International Airport, Sandton and Midrand, and the second was the remainder. The construction of the first phase was scheduled to take 45 months, and the second was for 54 months, with completion in 2010 and 2011.

Construction technology 
By the end of May 2008, nearly a third of the tunnelling was completed, and the excavation of the tunnels was completed on 11 September 2009.

A mixed-face Earth Pressure Balance Shield Tunnel Boring Machine (TBM) was designed and built in Germany by Herrenknecht specifically to cope with complex underground conditions and was the first such machine employed in South Africa. The TBM, named Imbokodo (meaning "rock"), installs pre-cast concrete tunnel lining segments behind it as it moves forward. It leaves behind a watertight and smooth lining to the 6.8 m (22 ft 4 in) diameter tunnel.

Opening to passenger traffic 

The first public passenger trip was made on 3 February 2009 by 150 people on a 3 km (2 mi) test track at the depot.

The first part of the System, between Sandton and OR Tambo International Airport, opened to the public on 8 June 2010, in time for the 2010 FIFA World Cup. The route from Rosebank to Pretoria and Hatfield commenced operations on 2 August 2011, while the remaining section from Rosebank South to Johannesburg Park Station opened on 7 June 2012, due to higher than anticipated underground water ingress into the railway tunnel.

For the first time since its opening to the public in 2010, the Gautrain system had been put to a halt since 27 March 2020 as part of the lockdown measures taken by the South African government during the COVID-19 pandemic. Passenger services started to progressively resume on 4 May 2020.

Specifications 
 Total route length –  (including  underground)
 Off-peak frequency – 1 train per 20 min
 Peak frequency – 1 train per 10 min

Tracks 

Although the national railway network in South Africa uses the 1,067 mm (3 ft 6 in) Cape gauge, Gautrain is built with the more expensive international standard gauge of 1,435 mm (4 ft 8 1⁄2 in). According to the Gautrain planning and implementation study, this is done for several reasons, including that a broader gauge is safer and more comfortable for passengers. The rolling stock is also easier, quicker and less expensive to obtain than Cape gauge rolling stock, and is also less expensive to maintain, as it is more tolerant of track imperfections than Cape Gauge. The  allows for travel at Gautrain's required speed of 160 km/h (99 mph).

Although increased flexibility could be obtained by keeping the system interoperable with the South African railway system, a strong case exists for keeping Gautrain separate from the existing network. According to the Gautrain planning and implementation study, an interoperable network may impact service delivery, increase the operating cost and tarnish Gautrain's image.

Network 

The rail network is 80 kilometres long and is connected to other forms of public transport like taxis, buses and the Metrorail public train system. Commuters can also use several Gautrain buses and midibuses to destinations within a 15-kilometre radius.

Travelling up to 160 kilometres per hour, Gautrain takes 35 minutes to travel between Johannesburg and Pretoria. From Sandton to the O.R. Tambo International Airport takes 15 minutes, and provision has been made for air passengers to remotely check in at Sandton Station in future.

Fares on the Johannesburg/Pretoria route vary according to the peak, shoulder peak and off-peak times, depending on the distance. The fare on the Gautrain Bus Link for a rail user varies from R9 during peak and R2 during off-peak times; for the midibuses, the fare is a standard R10 per trip. The method of payment on Gautrain buses uses the same personalized electronic ticket as for train travel, requiring a minimum balance of R20.00 for boarding a bus. To board the midibuses, tickets are bought at the midibus counter at the station. Special discounts apply on the purchase of weekly and monthly passes as well as the use of the train during off-peak periods. Tickets can only be purchased at stations and selected retail outlets and not on any bus. Commuters can now use contactless bank cards to tag in and out of the Gautrain Stations.

Stations 
Security cameras are operational and security guards patrol all the stations and parking areas. Only passengers who have an electronic ticket have access to Gautrain's stations and the parking areas. Motorists can travel to the stations and leave their cars at the safe parking bays that are next to the train stations. Parking at the stations costs R24 a day for a rail user, however, if a passenger does not remove their vehicle within an hour after arriving at the station, they will be charged R100. Car rental offices are also planned at the stations.

Ten stations are in operation:

 Hatfield (at grade)
 Pretoria (at grade)
 Centurion (elevated)
 Midrand (at grade)
 Marlboro (at grade)
 Sandton (underground)
 Rosebank (underground)
 Park Station (underground)
 Rhodesfield (elevated)
 O.R. Tambo International Airport (elevated)

Various South African and international engineering disciplines and engineering firms collaborated in the design of the system as a whole. Midrand, Centurion and Pretoria stations was designed by Terry Farrell of England. Each platform is 160 metres in length. Marlboro, Rhodesfield and OR Tambo International Airport Station's internal fit-out and platform envelope were designed by Jaco Groenewald and GAJV team. The OR Tambo International Airport Station envelope was designed by Izi Martinez during the OR Tambo International Airport upgrade. Rosebank and Johannesburg Park stations were designed by Atkins – Urban Edge architects joint venture.

Ticketing 
A cash-free ticketing system and the use of reloadable smart cards, the Gautrain Card makes travelling on the Gautrain quick and convenient.  Passengers can buy their Gautrain Cards at any Gautrain Station as well as approved service outlets. Europay, Mastercard and Visa contactless cards are also usable on Gautrain.

Rolling stock 

The Bombardier Electrostar, a model of a train common in South East England, was selected for the system. Fifteen cars were manufactured and assembled by Bombardier's Derby Litchurch Lane Works in England, with the remaining cars assembled by the Union Carriage & Wagon in South Africa using structural components made in England. Gautrain has 24 trains, each made up of four cars: 19 trains service the commuter network and five the airport link; the latter consists of forward rail cars especially adapted for the airport link; with storage area for luggage and more luxurious seating.

On 8 July 2008 the first train was handed over to the Gauteng Premier, Mbhazima Shilowa, in a ceremony in Derby. The last was delivered in December 2010.

There are currently plans for the acquisition of additional trains. In 2019, Gautrain investigated purchasing some second-hand Electrostars from England. The project entails the development of new depot facilities and the upgrading of the existing Gautrain signaling system. The additional train project is expected to have a significant and positive socio-economic impact in the Province as the Gauteng Provincial Government will insist on at least 65 percent local content by the successful bidder.

Criticism 
Much of the criticism is that money is being spent on the rich at the expense of the poor. Critics contend that it does not serve any of the townships of Gauteng where the transport problem is severe and where the majority of the people live. However, supporters maintain that the train was never meant to be an alternative to mass public transport; instead, it was intended to reduce pressure on Johannesburg's overloaded highway system. Figures released by the Gauteng provincial government in 2003 indicated that the project would do little to relieve traffic on the over-used Ben Schoeman Highway (one of the major motivations for the project), as traffic volumes would be higher when the Gautrain was completed and operating at full capacity in 2010. Leftist political groupings like the SACP and labour movements like COSATU branded the Gautrain as a train for the rich and called on the government not to proceed with the project. A national parliamentary oversight body, the Transport Portfolio Committee, held public hearings in November 2005 and subsequently advised Cabinet to scrap or postpone the project. However, National Cabinet decided on 7 December 2005 to financially support Gautrain.

Ridership 
Critics have questioned ridership estimates, stating that government officials almost always overestimate ridership to gain political approval for projects, and cite numerous international examples where similar projects operate at massive losses or were aborted. However, by October 2010, passenger numbers were in line with previous predictions and growing. Within 100 days of opening the first phase of the system for the public, 1 million passengers were recorded. As of February 2013, passenger volume was around 40 000 per day by train and 12 000 by bus. This is lower than expected in terms of passenger numbers, but this is partially offset by a longer average trip length (50 km vs the expected 30 km).  Peak volumes are higher than expected, though, which can be addressed by adding more coaches during peak times, and reducing the headway between trains from 12 to 10 minutes ahead of the intended 2015 schedule.  Tolling on Gauteng highways is also expected to lead to higher passenger numbers.

Alternative transportation projects 
Critics pointed out that the project would use the majority of available national and provincial transport funds in a context where massive amounts were needed to deal with widespread traffic congestion and commuter transport problems nationally and in the province. The existing railway system in the province, under national rather than provincial control, which serves the majority of the population, was severely underfunded and large-scale and violent public unrest caused by inadequate and old trains had manifested in the province. Critics alleged that options like rapid bus transit could achieve similar levels of service at a fraction of the costs, however, the estimated 62,000 daily riders require a capacity unfeasible by BRT. These matters were never submitted to a public debate as the project was designed and launched within the confines of the Gauteng Government bureaucracy.

Cost 
The project is the largest and costliest transport infrastructure project ever proposed by the provincial government but was never discussed in the Gauteng Provincial Legislature or submitted to any significant public debate before it was approved and put out to tender.  Initial cost estimates came in at some R3.5 – 4 billion in 2000 when the project was announced by Premier Shilowa. This figure was revised upwards to R 7 billion for the EIA process in 2003 and was finally revealed as being R20 billion (US$3.7 billion) in 2005 after the successful bidder for the project was announced and a contract came into existence. National and provincial governments will contribute R20 billion in equal proportions and Bombela will contribute the balance of direct project costs. Loan funding will constitute a large part of these amounts but the financing costs involved have not been stated. The sunk costs for the project will be more than R20 billion. In March 2008, Jeremy Cronin, chairman of the National Assembly's transport portfolio committee and deputy secretary-general of the SACP, complained that the cost had quietly crept up to R35 billion. Cronin has long opposed the project and told the SA Parliament's lower house during a budget debate that his information was that the project's cost was escalating "quietly and below the radar screen", though MPs "were told, hand on heart, here in Parliament just a few years ago, what the written-in-stone absolute upper limit was [R20 billion]".
The Gautrain management agency CEO, Jack van der Merwe, has subsequently denied this, stating that the project is a fixed-price, fixed-scope and fixed-period contract and that the price will only increase if the consumer price index increases above the South African Reserve Bank's prediction, if the Gauteng Province were in breach of contract, or if the project's scope were to change.

Cost estimates and timeline

Cash flow 
Hatfield station in Pretoria stopped paying its municipal property rates and taxes in 2020. By February 2022 they were R10 million in arrears and their power was disconnected.

References

External links 

 Gautrain Environmental Impact Assessment
 Gautrain Variant EIA investigations 2005/6
 Official Bombardier website

 
Transport operators of South Africa
Rapid transit in South Africa
RATP Group
Transport in Johannesburg
Transport in Pretoria
Railway companies of South Africa
Railway lines opened in 2010
Standard gauge railways in South Africa
Regional rail
South African brands
2010 establishments in South Africa